The 30th Street station was a local station on the demolished IRT Ninth Avenue Line in Manhattan, New York City. It was opened on December 13, 1873 as the replacement for the original northern terminus of the Ninth Avenue Line at 29th Street, which was built in 1868 The station which was originally built by the New York Elevated Railroad Company had two levels. The lower level was built first and had two tracks and two side platforms. The upper level was built as part of the Dual Contracts and had one track that served express trains that bypassed the station.  It closed on June 11, 1940. The next southbound stop was 23rd Street. The next northbound stop was 34th Street.

References

External links

IRT Ninth Avenue Line stations
Railway stations closed in 1873
Railway stations closed in 1940
Former elevated and subway stations in Manhattan